Emzar Nugzarovich Rozomashvili (born 11 July 1985) is a former Russian professional footballer of Georgian descent.

Club career
He made his professional debut for FC Shinnik Yaroslavl on 3 July 2004 in an Intertoto Cup game against FK Teplice.

See also
Football in Russia

References

External links
 
 

1985 births
Russian people of Georgian descent
Living people
Russian footballers
Association football midfielders
FC Shinnik Yaroslavl players